Dawid Janczyk (born 23 September 1987) is a Polish footballer who plays as a striker for Sadownik Waganiec.

Career
Janczyk began his career at Sandecja Nowy Sącz. In 2005, he joined Legia Warsaw in the Ekstraklasa.

On 12 July 2007 he signed a 5-year contract with CSKA Moscow, having impressed the club's scout at the 2007 FIFA U-20 World Cup. He scored his first goal for the Russian side on 8 August 2007 in a Russian Cup win against FC Khimki (2–0). His first league goal came on 2 September 2007 to earn a 1–1 tie against FC Spartak Moscow. On 23 October 2007 he made his first appearance in the UEFA Champions League, coming on in the 76th minute of the 1–2 loss against Internazionale. He won the 2007–08 Russian Cup with CSKA, converting his penalty during the penalty shootout. As of January 2009, all of his appearances in the Russian league have been off the bench.

In January 2009, he joined KSC Lokeren on loan until the end of the season. He scored on his debut for Lokeren on 14 February, leading to a 2–1 win against K.S.V. Roeselare. In March 2009, the loan was extended until the end of the 2009–2010 season, with CSKA Moscow having the right to recall Janczyk during the winter. In January 2010, he joined Germinal Beerschot on loan until June 2011 with a buy option.

In November 2010, he and Germinal agreed by mutual consent to end his loan agreement early, the manager having given him no playing time in the 2010–11 season. With CSKA Moscow's consent, he began training at Legia Warsaw. In February 2012, he played in a trial game for Irish side Limerick and scored a goal.

In 2018, he joined the amateur club, Weszło Warsaw. In October 2018, he joined Odra Wodzisław and played until 19 April 2019. After a spell at MKS Ciechanów from February to July 2020, Janczyk moved to Polish amateur club LZS Piotrówka.

International
He has also represented Poland at the junior level, scoring a hat trick against Belgium at the 2006 UEFA U-19 Championship. At the 2007 FIFA U-20 World Cup, he notched 3 goals in 4 games. Argentina had not conceded any goals in the tournament until Janczyk finally scored against them in the second round.

In April 2008 Polish national team coach Leo Beenhakker named Janczyk in a preliminary group of 31 players for Euro 2008. However, Janczyk did not make the cut when the group was reduced to the final squad of 23. He made his first appearance for the Polish national team during a friendly against Serbia in December 2008.

Personal life
Janczyk and fiancée, Dominika, have a daughter, Wiktoria, born in 2010.

Honours
Legia Warsaw
Ekstraklasa: 2005–06

CSKA Moscow
Russian Cup: 2007–08, 2008–09

References

External links
 
 Dawid Janczyk's national team stats on the website of the Polish Football Association 

1987 births
Living people
Association football forwards
Sportspeople from Nowy Sącz
Polish footballers
Poland youth international footballers
Poland under-21 international footballers
Poland international footballers
Polish expatriate footballers
Legia Warsaw players
Sandecja Nowy Sącz players
Korona Kielce players
PFC CSKA Moscow players
K.S.C. Lokeren Oost-Vlaanderen players
Beerschot A.C. players
FC Oleksandriya players
Piast Gliwice players
KTS Weszło Warsaw players
Ekstraklasa players
I liga players
Belgian Pro League players
Russian Premier League players
Expatriate footballers in Russia
Expatriate footballers in Ukraine
Expatriate footballers in Belgium
Expatriate footballers in Germany
Polish expatriate sportspeople in Russia
Polish expatriate sportspeople in Ukraine
Polish expatriate sportspeople in Belgium
Polish expatriate sportspeople in Germany